The 1970 Lesotho coup d'état was a self-coup that took place in Lesotho on 30 January 1970, led by Prime Minister Leabua Jonathan. It led to the assumption of dictatorial powers by Prime Minister Jonathan, who held the office since 1965. The coup was triggered by the victory of the opposition Basutoland Congress Party (BCP, led by Ntsu Mokhehle) over the ruling Basotholand National Party (BNP, led by Jonathan) in the general election.

Prime Minister Jonathan declared a state of emergency, annulled the election, dissolved parliament and suspended the constitution. King Moshoeshoe II was sent into exile after expressing disapproval of the actions. Jonathan himself was deposed in the 1986 coup d'état, led by General Justin Lekhanya.

References 

Military coups in Lesotho
1970 in Lesotho
Conflicts in 1970
1970s coups d'état and coup attempts
January 1970 events in Africa